The 2001–02 Belgian Cup was the 47th season of the main knockout competition in Belgian association football, the Belgian Cup.

Final rounds
The final phase started in the round of 32 when all clubs from the first division entered the competition (18 clubs plus 14 clubs from the qualifications). All rounds were played in one leg except for the semifinals (in two legs) and the quarter-finals (in one leg with replay). The final game was played at the Heysel Stadium in Brussels and won by Club Brugge against Mouscron.

Bracket

* after extra time

References

Belgian Cup seasons
Cup